Margaret Ann Boden  (born 26 November 1936) is a Research Professor of Cognitive Science in the Department of Informatics at the University of Sussex, where her work embraces the fields of artificial intelligence, psychology, philosophy, and cognitive and computer science.

Early life and education
Boden was educated at the City of London School for Girls in the late 1940s and 1950s. At Newnham College, Cambridge, she took first class honours in medical sciences, achieving the highest score across all Natural Sciences. In 1957 she studied the history of modern philosophy at the Cambridge Language Research Unit run by Margaret Masterman.

Career
Boden was appointed lecturer in philosophy at the University of Birmingham in 1959. She became a Harkness Fellow at Harvard University from 1962 to 1964, then returned to Birmingham for a year before moving to a lectureship in philosophy and psychology at Sussex University in 1965, where she was later appointed as Reader then Professor in 1980. She was awarded a PhD in social psychology (specialism: cognitive studies) by Harvard in 1968.

She credits reading "Plans and the Structure of Behavior" by George A. Miller with giving her the realisation that computer programming approaches could be applied to the whole of psychology.

Boden became Dean of the School of Social Sciences in 1985. Two years later she became the founding Dean of the University of Sussex's School of Cognitive and Computing Sciences (COGS), precursor of the university's current Department of Informatics. Since 1997 she has been a Research Professor of Cognitive Science in the Department of Informatics, where her work encompasses the fields of artificial intelligence, psychology, philosophy, and cognitive and computer science.

Boden became a Fellow of the British Academy in 1983 and served as its vice-president from 1989 to 1991.  Boden is a member of the editorial board for The Rutherford Journal.

In 2001 Boden was appointed an OBE for her services in the field of cognitive science. The same year she was also awarded an honorary Doctor of Science from the University of Sussex. She also received an honorary degree from the University of Bristol. A PhD Scholarship that is awarded annually by the Department of Informatics at the University of Sussex was named in her honor.

Media
In October 2014 and January 2015, Boden was interviewed by Jim Al-Khalili on the BBC Radio Four programme The Life Scientific.

In February 2017, Boden, along with other researchers, participated in a debate organized by the British Academy on the readiness of humans to develop romantic relationships with robots.

Publications
Purposive Explanation in Psychology (Harvard University Press, 1972);
Artificial Intelligence and Natural Man (1977/1987: 2nd edn., MIT Press), 
Piaget (Fontana Modern Masters 1979; 2nd edn. HarperCollins, 1984);
 The Case for a Cognitive Biology. (In Proceedings of the Aristotelian Society, 54: 25–40, with Susan Khin Zaw, 1980);
Minds and Mechanisms (Cornell University Press, 1981);
Computer Models of Mind: Computational approaches in theoretical psychology (Cambridge University Press, 1988), 
Artificial Intelligence in Psychology: Interdisciplinary Essays (MIT Press, 1989), 
The Philosophy of Artificial Intelligence, ed. (Oxford Readings in Philosophy, Oxford University Press, 1989/90), 
The Creative Mind: Myths and Mechanisms (Weidenfeld/Abacus & Basic Books, 1990; 2nd edn. Routledge, 2004), 
Dimensions of Creativity, ed. (MIT Press, 1994);
The Philosophy of Artificial Life, ed. Oxford University Press, 1996).
Artificial Intelligence (Handbook of Perception and Cognition, 2nd Ed, Academic Press Inc., 1996), 
Mind As Machine: a History of Cognitive Science, (2 volumes, Oxford University Press, 2006),  / . This generated public disagreement with Noam Chomsky.
AI: Its Nature and Future (2016),

Honours
 Boden was awarded an O.B.E. in 2001 for "services to cognitive science".
 Fellow (and former vice-president) of the British Academy — and Chairman of their Philosophy Section until July 2002.
 Member of the Academia Europaea.
 Fellow of the American Association for Artificial Intelligence (AAAI).
 Fellow of the European Coordinating Committee for Artificial Intelligence (ECCAI).
 Life Fellow of the UK's Society for Artificial Intelligence and the Simulation of Behaviour.
 Member of Council of the Royal Institute of Philosophy.
 Former Vice-President (and Chairman of Council) of the Royal Institution of Great Britain.
 In April 2004 she was awarded an honorary degree by the Open University as Doctor of the University.
 In 2016 she was awarded the ISAL award for Lifetime Achievement in the field of Artificial Life
 Honorary Fellow of the Cybernetics Society.

See also
 Cognitive biology
 Mike Cooley

References

External links
Prof. Maggie Boden, University of Sussex, Department of Informatics
Humbleapproach.templeton.org
University of Sussex, Department of Informatics
 Critical review of Mind As Machine by Noam Chomsky
Boden's reply to reviews by Feldman, Thagard, and Chomsky of Mind As Machine
Downloadable 30 minute interview on BBC Radio Four The Life Scientific.
 Interviewed by Alan Macfarlane 20 March 2015 (video)

1936 births
Living people
Artificial intelligence researchers
Fellows of the SSAISB
Academics of the University of Sussex
Members of Academia Europaea
Fellows of the Association for the Advancement of Artificial Intelligence
Fellows of the British Academy
Officers of the Order of the British Empire
Women systems scientists
Cyberneticists
Women cyberneticists
Alumni of Newnham College, Cambridge
Harvard University alumni
Women cognitive scientists
Fellows of the European Association for Artificial Intelligence
Researchers of artificial life
People educated at the City of London School for Girls